Bradley Smith (born October 9, 1968) is an American professional stock car racing driver who competes full-time in the ARCA Menards Series, driving the No. 48 Chevrolet SS for his team, Brad Smith Motorsports. Smith is a veteran of the series, having made over 400 starts in it since 1988. He made his debut in the ARCA Menards Series East (previously the NASCAR K&N Pro Series East) in 2020 and ARCA Menards Series West (previously the NASCAR K&N Pro Series West) in 2021, and he and his team have also competed part-time in those series since then.

Racing career

An oil fire at Talladega Superspeedway in 2003 burned Smith's face and arms, resulting in a hospital stay. In the late portions of the 2000s, Smith hosted students from the University of Northwestern Ohio on his racing crew.

During the 2015 International Motorsports Hall of Fame 200 at Talladega, Austin Wayne Self spun in the tri-oval, and collected Smith's racecar, which went pinballing off both the outside and inside retaining walls. Press reports indicated that the crash fractured Smith's left ankle, although Smith later described the injury as a sprain. A planned full-time season was derailed, as Smith needed a wheelchair for five months following the crash. He returned for a full season the following year and received the General Tire Spirit Award. Smith was driving for James Hylton Motorsports in 2018 when Hylton was killed in a hauler accident. The team completed the 2018 season and rebranded as Smith Brothers Racing, led by Smith and his brother Jeff. The group retained many of the same personnel from Hylton's team. In 2020, Smith claimed his first series top-ten at Winchester Speedway; the finish came in his 363rd start. Despite not having much success in 2021, only finishing three races under power and missing Daytona, Smith was able to score his career best points finish, 5th.

Personal life
Smith was an engineer at General Motors before being laid off in 2019. He has been married and divorced twice. Smith graduated from Utica Eisenhower High School.

Motorsports career results

ARCA Menards Series
(key) (Bold – Pole position awarded by qualifying time. Italics – Pole position earned by points standings or practice time. * – Most laps led.)

ARCA Menards Series East

ARCA Menards Series West

References

External links

 
 
 

1968 births
Living people
People from Oceana County, Michigan
Racing drivers from Michigan
ARCA Menards Series drivers